Dufe or DUFE may refer to
Sahndra Fon Dufe (born 1989), Cameroon-born actress, author, screenwriter and film producer
Dongbei University of Finance and Economics in Dalian, China
DUFE—Surrey International Institute, an academic partnership